Dragoljub Simonović (born 30 October 1972) is a Serbian-born Bulgarian former footballer.

Club career
Simonović began his club career at the local FK Obilić, before transferring to Bulgarian Litex Lovech in 1998, where he won the 1998/1999 Bulgarian Championship. In 2001, he transferred to CSKA Sofia.

He also played one match for the Bulgaria national team.

Coaching career
He had been appointed on 16 January 2006 as a manager of OFC Sliven 2000.
Simonović won the Bulgarian second division thus qualified the club in top division for 2008/2009 season. In January 2009 he became manager of Spartak Varna.

References

External links
 

Living people
1972 births
Serbian football managers
Serbian footballers
Serbian expatriate footballers
Bulgarian footballers
Bulgaria international footballers
FK Obilić players
PFC Litex Lovech players
PFC CSKA Sofia players
PFC Litex Lovech managers
PFC Spartak Varna managers
First Professional Football League (Bulgaria) players
Association football midfielders
Footballers from Belgrade
Expatriate football managers in Bulgaria

Bulgarian people of Serbian descent